Charles Buller Heberden (14 December 1849 – 30 May 1921) was an English classical scholar and academic administrator. He was principal of Brasenose College, Oxford (1889–1920) and served as Vice-Chancellor of Oxford University.

Life
He was born at Broadhembury in Devon, the son of the Rev. William Heberden. He was educated at Harrow School and Balliol College, Oxford, from 1868, where he was a contemporary of Benjamin Jowett.

Heberden edited a book on the history of Brasenose College, published in 1909.
He funded a Harrow Scholarship for Brasenose College in 1916 and an Organ Scholarship in 1921 at his death. He also left £1,000 to the university, which was used for the Coin Room at the Ashmolean Museum.

He was on the governing body of Abingdon School from 1914 to 1921.

Heberden is buried in Holywell Cemetery, Oxford.

References

External links
 Heberden Coin Room, Ashmolean Museum, Oxford

1849 births
1921 deaths
People from East Devon District
Alumni of Balliol College, Oxford
English classical scholars
People educated at Harrow School
Principals of Brasenose College, Oxford
Vice-Chancellors of the University of Oxford
People associated with the Ashmolean Museum
Governors of Abingdon School
Burials at Holywell Cemetery